Jesús Cabeza (born 30 October 1959) is a Venezuelan boxer. He competed in the men's middleweight event at the 1980 Summer Olympics.

References

1959 births
Living people
Venezuelan male boxers
Olympic boxers of Venezuela
Boxers at the 1980 Summer Olympics
Place of birth missing (living people)
Middleweight boxers